Qeshlaq-e Hajj Amir Maherem (also Romanized as Qeshlāq-e Ḩājj Amīr Maḥerem) is a village in Qeshlaq-e Shomali Rural District, in the Central District of Parsabad County, Ardabil Province, Iran. At the 2006 census, its population was 83, in 21 families.

References 

Towns and villages in Parsabad County